"Robbery" is a song by American rapper and singer Juice Wrld. It was released on February 13, 2019, via Grade A Productions through exclusive licensing to Interscope Records, as the lead single for his second studio album, Death Race for Love. "Robbery" has over 1 Billion streams on Spotify.

Background 
An emotional separation-themed song, "Robbery" was described as being about "a woman stealing Juice's heart", by Complex and how Juice takes revenge against her while consuming liquor.

It was produced by Nick Mira, who also produced Juice's multi-platinum-certified single "Lucid Dreams". Rolling Stone described the song as "dark and melodramatic" while calling it "a clunky metaphor about a woman demanding love" from Juice.

Lyrically, the first verse discusses the comparison of Juice's father advising him about not revealing his insecurities to women and his heart's stance of the contrary.

XXL noted the song as a "heartfelt track about a love that has left Juice broken and confused," while Highsnobiety identified it as a "melancholic lamenting about a past love."

Music video 
The official music video for the song was published on Valentine's Day to Lyrical Lemonade, a YouTube channel owned by Cole Bennett, who directed the video along with several of Juice's other music videos.

Bennett was noted for "bringing his after-effects-addled eye" to the video of "Robbery" and "providing it with the same bugged out visual energy" of "Lucid Dreams". Artistically, the video was described as having "splashes of flames" in many scenes while lacking Bennett's signature neon and warping effects.

HipHopDX described the plot as an emo-crooning of Juice while being "surrounded by a background of fire".

Plot-wise, Juice is shown drinking a bottle of Hennessy while walking through the wedding of his ex-lover with another person, to "numb the pain" and "deal with the agony". Shortly after, while leaving, he throws his burning cigarette onto a flower held by a guest, eventually causing the venue's destruction.

The video performance was officially uploaded on Lyrical Lemonade YouTube Channel on the 14 February 2019. As of April 15, 2022, the music video as reached more than 418 million (418,667,921).

Personnel 
Adapted from Tidal.
Jarad Higgins – vocals, composition
Nick Mira – producer, composition
Brandon Dickinson Jr. – mixing, studio person

Charts

Weekly charts

Year-end charts

Certifications

Release history

References

External links
 

2019 singles
2019 songs
Juice Wrld songs
Interscope Records singles
Songs written by Juice Wrld
Songs written by Nick Mira